The  2015 Mexico road accident  occurred on July 29th, 2015. At least 27 people were killed and 149 injured after an out of control truck ran into a religious procession in the state of Zacatecas.

References

2015 road incidents
Road accident
History of Zacatecas